Wenqing Zhang is the head of WHO's global influenza programme.

References

Living people
World Health Organization officials
Year of birth missing (living people)
Place of birth missing (living people)